Sambus is a genus of beetles in the family Buprestidae, the jewel beetles. There are some 165 species distributed across Africa, parts of Asia, and Oceania, including Australia.

Species include:

 Sambus achilles Obenberger, 1940
 Sambus adonis Obenberger, 1924
 Sambus aeneas Obenberger, 1940
 Sambus aeneicollis Fisher, 1921
 Sambus aeneus Kerremans, 1900
 Sambus aethiopicus Obenberger, 1935
 Sambus africanus Kerremans, 1903
 Sambus aiax Obenberger, 1940
 Sambus albopunctatus (Fåhraeus in Boheman, 1851)
 Sambus alienus Obenberger, 1935
 Sambus amabilis Deyrolle, 1864
 Sambus angolensis Obenberger, 1935
 Sambus argentatus Gestro, 1877
 Sambus aruensis Théry, 1926
 Sambus atropurpureus Fisher, 1925
 Sambus auberti Théry, 1926
 Sambus auricolor Saunders, 1874
 Sambus australis Bellamy & Peterson, 2000
 Sambus bakeri Fisher, 1921
 Sambus bakerianus Obenberger, 1924
 Sambus barkeri Bellamy, 2007
 Sambus bedoti Théry, 1926
 Sambus binhensis Descarpentries & Villiers, 1966
 Sambus boettcheri Obenberger, 1932
 Sambus boisduvali (Montrouzier, 1855)
 Sambus butuanensis Obenberger, 1932
 Sambus caesar Obenberger, 1935
 Sambus camerunicus Obenberger, 1922
 Sambus castor Obenberger, 1940
 Sambus chalcosomus Thomson, 1879
 Sambus cochinchinae Obenberger, 1924
 Sambus coeruleipennis Théry, 1930
 Sambus coloratus Kerremans, 1892
 Sambus confusus Fisher, 1921
 Sambus congolanus Obenberger, 1924
 Sambus coxalis Obenberger, 1935
 Sambus curtus Théry, 1926
 Sambus cyaneomicans Obenberger, 1932
 Sambus daoensis Descarpentries & Villiers, 1966
 Sambus darlingtoni Théry, 1937
 Sambus davidi Théry, 1926
 Sambus dedicatus Thomson, 1879
 Sambus delectabilis Kerremans, 1900
 Sambus delicatulus Obenberger, 1924
 Sambus deyrollei Thomson, 1878
 Sambus dives Deyrolle, 1864
 Sambus divisus Deyrolle, 1864
 Sambus dohertyi Théry, 1926
 Sambus douquetteae Descarpentries, 1968
 Sambus drescheri Obenberger, 1932
 Sambus eremitus Obenberger, 1924
 Sambus fasciatus Fisher, 1921
 Sambus faustinus Obenberger, 1924
 Sambus femoralis Kerremans, 1892
 Sambus fidjiensis Obenberger, 1924
 Sambus formosanus Miwa & Chûjô, 1935
 Sambus fouqueti Bourgoin, 1923
 Sambus fulgidicollis Kerremans, 1900
 Sambus fulvopictus Kerremans, 1900
 Sambus gautierii Deyrolle, 1864
 Sambus gibbicollis Kerremans, 1892
 Sambus gibbosus Fisher, 1921
 Sambus gmelinae Théry, 1930
 Sambus gratiosulus Obenberger, 1932
 Sambus gratiosus Kerremans, 1900
 Sambus haddeni Obenberger, 1932
 Sambus hewitti Kerremans, 1912
 Sambus hirtulus Obenberger, 1935
 Sambus inermipes Bourgoin, 1923
 Sambus isis Jackman, 1987
 Sambus javicolus Fisher, 1935
 Sambus jelineki Descarpentries & Villiers, 1966
 Sambus kannegieteri Obenberger, 1924
 Sambus kanssuensis Ganglbauer, 1890
 Sambus labaili Baudon, 1968
 Sambus lafertei Deyrolle, 1864
 Sambus larminati Théry, 1926
 Sambus lituratus Deyrolle, 1864
 Sambus loriae Kerremans, 1892
 Sambus lugubris Saunders, 1874
 Sambus luzonicus Fisher, 1921
 Sambus luzonigena Obenberger, 1932
 Sambus macromerus Montrouzier, 1860
 Sambus madagascariensis Descarpentries, 1968
 Sambus manni Théry, 1937
 Sambus maquilingi Obenberger, 1924
 Sambus marmoreus Théry, 1926
 Sambus marshalli (Obenberger, 1923)
 Sambus massaicus Obenberger, 1940
 Sambus melanoderus Kerremans, 1892
 Sambus minutus Kerremans, 1896
 Sambus modestus Kerremans, 1892
 Sambus monardi Théry, 1947
 Sambus montanus Kerremans, 1908
 Sambus muong Descarpentries & Villiers, 1966
 Sambus nickerli Obenberger, 1924
 Sambus nigricans Fisher, 1921
 Sambus nigritus Kerremans, 1892
 Sambus novus Théry, 1926
 Sambus opacus Kerremans, 1900
 Sambus optatus Théry, 1926
 Sambus ornatus Fisher, 1921
 Sambus orothi Baudon, 1962
 Sambus pacificus Théry, 1926
 Sambus palawanus Théry, 1926
 Sambus papuanus (Obenberger, 1924)
 Sambus parallelus Fisher, 1921
 Sambus parisii Deyrolle, 1864
 Sambus patroclus Obenberger, 1940
 Sambus pauper Kerremans, 1900
 Sambus pertoldi Obenberger, 1922
 Sambus peyrierasi Descarpentries, 1968
 Sambus philippinarum Obenberger, 1924
 Sambus philippinus Fisher, 1922
 Sambus pictus Kerremans, 1900
 Sambus pollux Obenberger, 1940
 Sambus prainae Hauser, 1900
 Sambus pudicus Théry, 1926
 Sambus pygmaeus Kerremans, 1903
 Sambus quadricolor Saunders, 1873
 Sambus quinquefasciatus Miwa & Chûjô, 1935
 Sambus ribbei Théry, 1926
 Sambus rothkirchi Obenberger, 1923
 Sambus sandakanus Obenberger, 1924
 Sambus satanellus Obenberger, 1917
 Sambus seyrigi Descarpentries, 1968
 Sambus sibuyanicus Obenberger, 1932
 Sambus signatus Théry, 1926
 Sambus simmondsi Théry, 1938
 Sambus simplex Kerremans, 1900
 Sambus soricinus Deyrolle, 1864
 Sambus ssp. unifasciatus Kurosawa, 1985
 Sambus strandi Obenberger, 1924
 Sambus subgrisescens Deyrolle, 1864
 Sambus sulcicollis Théry, 1930
 Sambus telamon Obenberger, 1940
 Sambus thoracalis Obenberger, 1932
 Sambus timoris Obenberger, 1935
 Sambus tonkinensis Obenberger, 1924
 Sambus troilus Obenberger, 1940
 Sambus vadoni Descarpentries, 1968
 Sambus vanrooni Obenberger, 1923
 Sambus vermiculatus Deyrolle, 1864
 Sambus vientianensis Baudon, 1968
 Sambus villosus Kerremans, 1903
 Sambus viridiceps (Kerremans, 1900)
 Sambus vitalisi Descarpentries & Villiers, 1966
 Sambus weyersi Kerremans, 1900
 Sambus yaeyamanus Kurosawa, 1985
 Sambus zonalis Kerremans, 1893

References

Buprestidae genera